The discography of Maija Vilkkumaa, a Finnish pop rock singer-songwriter, consists of eight studio albums, two compilation albums, one live album, 22 singles (including one featured single), two promotional singles and 12 music videos. According to Musiikkituottajat, Vilkkumaa has sold over 300,000 certified records in Finland to date.

Albums

Studio albums

Live albums

Compilation albums

Extended plays

Singles
The chart positions refer to the two Finnish Singles Charts; the left column to the comprehensive, and the right to the digital sales chart.

As lead artist

 A These charted later as downloadable, non-single tracks from the latter, 2006 compilation album Totuutta ja tehtävää.

As featured artist

Promotional singles
These Maija Vilkkumaa singles were released for radio airplay only.

Music videos

1999: "Satumaa-tango"
1999: "Tähti"
2001: "Totuutta ja tehtävää"
2001: "Ingalsin Laura"
2003: "Ei" (featuring the actress Minna Haapkylä)
2005: "Kesä"
2006: "Hei tie"
2007: "Saaressa"
2008: "Suojatiellä"
2008: "Luokkakokous"
2010: "Lottovoitto"
2010: "Kuuraiset puut"

References

Vilkkumaa, Maija
Discography
Vilkkumaa, Maija
Vilkkumaa, Maija